Dmitri Vyacheslavovich Seryozhkin (born 18 July 1976) is a Russian professional football manager and a former player. He is the manager of FC Ryazan.

External links
 

1976 births
People from Voskresensk
Living people
Russian footballers
Association football midfielders
FC Saturn Ramenskoye players
FC Dynamo Bryansk players
FC Lukhovitsy players
FC Spartak Kostroma players
Russian football managers
FC Saturn Ramenskoye managers
Sportspeople from Moscow Oblast